The Barbados Labour Party (BLP), colloquially known as the "Bees", is a social democratic political party in Barbados established in 1938. Led by Prime Minister Mia Amor Mottley, it is the governing party of Barbados and the sole ruling party in the House of Assembly of Barbados, holding 30 out of 30 seats. The BLP was elected to government on 25 May 2018 after a decade in opposition, with Mottley becoming the country's first female prime minister. The party originally won all of the seats in the House of Assembly, but Bishop Joseph Atherley, the MP for St. Michael West, became an independent MP (later founder and leader of the People's Party for Democracy and Development) and the leader of the opposition on 2 June 2018. The party won all 30 seats in the 2022 general election. 

In common with Barbados' other major party, the Democratic Labour Party or the "Dems", the BLP has been broadly described as a centre-left social-democratic party, with local politics being largely personality-driven and responsive to contemporary issues and the state of the economy. However, the party distinguishes itself by being rooted in Asquithian Liberal policies, including a focus on trade as a way of bolstering economic growth over the creation of social services.

The BLP is a former observer member of the Socialist International.

History 
Originally called the Barbados Progressive League until 1944, the party was founded on 31 March 1938 at the home of James Martineau. During the first meeting, Chrissie Brathwaite and Grantley Adams were elected as chairman and vice-chairman, respectively. Adams had entered the House of Assembly in 1934 partly through his deconstruction of the labour-focused efforts of the Charles Duncan O'Neal’s Democratic League, but this new party turned to organizing the political movement brought on by the unrest of 1937 that he had earlier opposed. As such, their objectives included many of the league’s original goals, such as adult suffrage, free education, and better housing and health care.

The BLP first participated in general elections in 1940. In 1994, Owen Arthur became the prime minister as leader of the Barbados Labour Party. In the 2003 elections the BLP won 23 out of the 30 seats. The number increased to 24 in 2006, when in an almost unprecedented development the leader of the opposition, after a bitter and tumultuous internal battle within his own party, resigned the post and joined the governing party.

The Barbados Labour Party governed from 1994 to 2008, which was commonly called the "Owen Arthur Administration". Prime Minister Arthur was chosen from among leaders around the globe to deliver the William Wilberforce lecture on the 200th anniversary of the Abolition of the Atlantic Slave Trade Act.

The party lost power in the 2008 general election, winning 10 seats against 20 for the Democratic Labour Party (DLP). After the election, Arthur stepped down as BLP leader and was replaced by former deputy prime minister Mia Mottley in a leadership election against Attorney-General of Barbados Dale Marshall. Mottley also became opposition leader.

In the summer of 2008 Hamilton Lashley, MP for St. Michael South East, resigned from the party to become an independent candidate in the House of Assembly. He was thereafter given a job by the DLP, the party he had belonged before crossing the floor to the BLP, as a consultant on poverty. This move by the member reduced to nine the number of seats the Barbados Labour Party had in the House.

The BLP returned to power in 2018 under Mia Mottley, who became Barbados's first female prime minister. In January 2022, Prime Minister Mia Mottley’s Labor Party (BLP) obtained a landslide victory, winning all 30 legislative seats, in the first general election since Barbados became a republic in 2021.

Electoral history

House of Assembly elections

West Indies election

2018 candidates 

 Wilfred Abrahams (Christ Church East)
 William Duguid (Christ Church West)
 Rev. Joseph Atherley (St. Michael West)
 Colin Jordan (St. Peter)
 Jeffrey Bostic (The City of Bridgetown)
 Santia Bradshaw (St. Michael South East)
 Gline Clarke (St. George North)
 Adrian "Medic" Forde (Christ Church West Central)
 John King (St. Philip West)
 Ian Gooding-Edghill (St. Michael West Central)

 Cynthia Forde (St. Thomas)
 Marsha K. Caddle (St. Michael South Central)
 Charles Griffith (St. John)
 Edmund Hinkson (St. James North)
 Arthur Holder (St. Michael Central)
 Sandra Husbands (St. James South)
 Kirk Humphrey (St. Michael South)
 Dale Marshall (St. Joseph)
 Mia Mottley (St. Michael North East)
 Neil Rowe (St. Michael North West)

 George Payne (St. Andrew)
 Peter Phillips (St. Lucy)
 Trevor Prescod (St. Michael East)
 Ryan Straughn (Christ Church East Central)
 Dwight Sutherland (St. George South)
 Kerrie Symmonds (St. James Central)
 Ronald Toppin (St. Michael North)
 Dr. Ralph Thorne (Christ Church South)
 Sonia Browne (St. Philip North)
 Indar Weir (St. Philip South)

Branches 
The women's branch of the Barbados Labour Party is called the Women's League. The youth branch is called the League of Young Socialists.

References

Further reading
 F. A. Hoyes. The Rise of West Indian Democracy: The Life and Times of Sir Grantley Adams. Advocate Press (1963).

External links

Former member parties of the Socialist International
Labour parties
Political parties established in 1938
Political parties in Barbados
Social democratic parties in North America
Republicanism in Barbados
1938 establishments in Barbados